More is a 1969 English-language romantic drama film written and directed by Barbet Schroeder in his directorial debut. Starring Mimsy Farmer and Klaus Grünberg, the film deals with heroin addiction as drug fascination on the island of Ibiza, Spain. Made in the political fallout of the 1960s counterculture, 
it features drug use, "free love", and other references to contemporary European youth culture.

The screenplay was written by Paul Gégauff and Barbet Schroeder with the original story by Schroeder. It features a soundtrack written and performed by the English rock band Pink Floyd, released as the album More. Schroeder's inspiration for the film came from the counterculture tradition of the 1960s with themes of drugs, addiction, sexual freedom and the beauty of life often in New Wave films. Real drugs were used in scenes showing the use of marijuana, heroin, and LSD. Production began in 1968 with a low budget, and the film was partially funded by Jet Films and executive produced by Les Films du Losange.

Upon its release on 4 August 1969, More garnered mostly negative reviews from critics. It was selected to be screened in the Cannes Classics section of the 2015 Cannes Film Festival. More was released on DVD on 5 April 2005 by Home Vision Entertainment.

Plot
In West Germany in the late 1960s, Stefan has finished his mathematics studies and decides to experience life. Hitch-hiking to Paris, he is befriended by a petty criminal called Charlie, who takes him to a party where he is fascinated by an American girl called Estelle. Though Charlie warns him that she is a drug user and dangerous, he goes to her hotel room, where she introduces him to marijuana and they make love.

She is leaving for Ibiza and invites Stefan to follow her there. When he arrives, he finds she is involved with a wealthy ex-Nazi called Wolf. Stefan persuades her to join him in an isolated villa and she secretly brings both money and a huge quantity of heroin she has stolen from Wolf. After an idyllic time swimming, sunbathing and making love, she is itching for the heroin and introduces him to it as well.

Soon the two are on a downward spiral of addiction. Wolf demands return of the rest of the heroin and money and, as payment for what they have used, Stefan has to work in his bar while Estelle has to share his bed. Charlie comes looking for Stefan and urges him to return to Paris. Stefan begs two packets of heroin from a dealer and overdoses. As a suicide, he is buried in open country.

Cast

 Mimsy Farmer as Estelle Miller
 Klaus Grünberg as Stefan Brückner
 Heinz Engelmann as Dr. Ernesto Wolf
 Michel Chanderli as Charlie
 Henry Wolf as Henry
 Louise Wink as Cathy

Production

The French film censorship board in 1969 insisted that some of the dialogue be censored around the 81-minute mark before the film could be released. In the film, as the couple mixes up a hallucinogenic concoction in the kitchen, the ingredients "benzedrine" and "banana peel" are deleted from the audio track. On the DVD the words have been re-added as subtitles.

Most of the movie was shot on the island of Ibiza. The castle of Ibiza, which dominates the harbour and the town, is the scene for the final act. A tunnel near the castle was also used. In Paris, the movie was shot at Hotel La Louisiane in real room 36.

Music

The soundtrack to the film was composed and performed by English rock band Pink Floyd, and consists of instrumental compositions and more conventional songs, such as "The Nile Song", which (somewhat out of character for Pink Floyd) borders on Stooges-like heavy rock, and a ballad featuring bongos called "Cymbaline", written by Roger Waters and performed by David Gilmour.

Release

Critical reception
Upon its release, More garnered mainly negative reviews from critics, and was controversially reviewed by audiences and scholars, who commented on the drug use and impacts. On Rotten Tomatoes, the film has 4 reviews, 3 are negative. At AlloCiné, which assigns a weighted mean rating to reviews, the film has a score of 3.7 based on 37 critics.

With regard to the film's overall design, Roger Ebert stated, "More is a weird, freaky movie about two hedonistic kids who destroy themselves with drugs. More precisely, it's about a kinky American girl who destroys her German boyfriend and in the process destroys herself ... The message seems to be: Sure, speed kills, but what a way to go."

Home media
The film was released on DVD by The Criterion Collection under Home Vision Entertainment on 5 April 2005. A Blu-ray as a single disc variant with a single DVD disc version was released on 19 September 2011 by the British Film Institute.

See also 

 List of French films of 1969
 French New Wave
 Counterculture of the 1960s

References

Further reading
 
Dawson, Jan (1970). Review of More in Monthly Film Bulletin, April 1970.

External links
 
 
 
 
 
 
 
 
 

1969 films
1969 romantic drama films
French romantic drama films
German romantic drama films
Luxembourgian romantic drama films
West German films
1960s English-language films
Films about heroin addiction
Films directed by Barbet Schroeder
Films set in Ibiza
Films shot in the Balearic Islands
Films produced by Barbet Schroeder
Films with screenplays by Paul Gégauff
Films about cannabis
English-language French films
English-language German films
English-language Luxembourgian films
1969 directorial debut films
1960s British films
1960s French films
1960s German films
Films scored by Pink Floyd